Davood Azad (born 6 October 1963) is an Iranian singer, multi-instrumental musician and composer who sings both Iranian classical music and Azeri folk music. He is the first Iranian lecturer invited to Oxford University to lecture about Iranian music and its forms.

Davood Azad was born in Urmia, Azerbaijan. He is an ethnic Iranian Azerbaijani multi-instrumentalist and vocalist in Iranian classical music, Azerbaijani folk music, Ancient Persian music, and Persian Sufi music.

In his work "The Divan of Rumi & Bach" Azad joins Iranian Traditional music with Bach's famous melodies.

See also 
 Mohammad Reza Shajarian
 Music of Iran
 List of Iranian musicians

References

External links
 Davood Azad's Official Website
 Davood Azad's Profile on TMusic
 	

1963 births
Living people
Iranian classical singers
21st-century Iranian male singers
People from Urmia
Azerbaijani-language singers
20th-century Iranian male singers